Grangegorman is a stop on the Luas light-rail tram system in Dublin, Ireland.  It opened in 2017 as a stop on Luas Cross City, an extension of the Green Line through the city centre from St. Stephen's Green to Broombridge.

Location
The stop is located to the side of a Dublin Bus depot at Broadstone, and its sole entrance and exit is a pathway leading from Grangegorman to the southern end of the northbound platform.  It has two edge platforms with walls at either side.

Grangegorman provides access to immediate access to the main campus of Technological University Dublin, and at some distance, the Mater Hospital.  During the planning of Luas Cross City, it was envisaged that Grangegorman stop would not be built, but rather a provision for a future stop would be made at that site.  Late in the development, it was decided to build the stop after all.

References

Luas Green Line stops in Dublin (city)
Railway stations opened in 2017
2017 establishments in Ireland
Railway stations in the Republic of Ireland opened in the 21st century